The Real World: Seattle is the seventh season of MTV's reality television series The Real World, which focuses on a group of diverse strangers living together for several months in a different city each season, as cameras follow their lives and interpersonal relationships. It is the third season of The Real World to be filmed in the Pacific States region, specifically in Washington and is also the first season to be filmed in the Pacific Northwest.

The season featured seven people who lived on Pier 70 of Seattle, Washington's Elliott Bay. The season premiered on June 16, 1998, and consisted of 20 episodes.  It is the first of two seasons to be filmed in Seattle. Eighteen years later, the show returned to the city in its thirty-second season.

It is notable for an incident in which cast member Stephen Williams slapped Irene McGee as she moved out of the house, which is cited as one of the series' memorable moments by Time magazine.

Season changes
This season was the first to feature cast members who knew each other before arriving at the house. David and Nathan were both cadets at the Virginia Military Institute, which is why they say "This is the true story of seven people" instead of "seven strangers" in the opening sequence.

Assignment
Almost every season of The Real World, beginning with its fifth season, has included the assignment of a season-long group job or task to the housemates. The Seattle cast worked as "modulators" at KNDD-FM, an alternative rock radio station. Their job begins as a series of promotional duties but eventually leads to producing and hosting a live radio show.

The residence
The cast lived at Pier 70, a  pier located at 2815 Alaskan Way in Seattle, just north of the intersection of Alaskan Way and Clay Street, on Elliott Bay. It was built in 1902 by shipping industry pioneers Ainsworth & Dunn.  One of the largest docks on the waterfront, Pier 70 initially served sailing and steamer ships, such as the famous Blue Funnel Line, a fleet of large freighters that operated between Europe, the Orient and the Pacific Coast. In 1916, a spectacular fire destroyed the upper Pier and roof, and required rebuilding of the dock. During World War II, the Washington state Liquor Board used the Pier as a warehouse, and from 1946 to 1955, the United States Coast Guard used it as its Seattle base. In 1970, Ainsworth & Dunn converted it into for retail and restaurant space. Triad Development bought it in 1995 and converted it into office/retail space for tenants such as Pier 1 Imports. A pier would again be used for a season residence on The Real World: Brooklyn in 2009.

For filming of the season, the interior design was handled by Two Downtown, Ltd. Residential use of the Pier is prohibited by urban harborfront districting, which required the production to obtain a special permit declaring the Pier a 24-hour film set. It has since been completely remodeled, with its brick surface replaced with conventional siding, and only somewhat resembles the pier seen during filming. It is now used for retail and office space, and is home to the Waterfront Seafood Grill, which changed its name to Aqua by El Gaucho in 2011. The original seven roommates of Real World Seattle: Bad Blood dined at Aqua by El Gaucho in their season's first episode in 2016.

Cast

Episodes

Season highlights
Nathan must deal with the perils of a long-distance relationship with his girlfriend, exacerbated in part by his close friendship with housemate Irene.

Lindsay is horrified when she is told over the phone that a friend has committed suicide. She does not attend the funeral, wanting to remember her friend how he was. The cast tries to console her, but she pushes them away. Janet and others worry about Lindsay's mental and physical health because she will not talk about the suicide. Lindsay says that keeping things to herself is how she deals with things.

Stephen's mother has another baby, and Stephen is worried about his mother surviving the delivery. He is seen crying on his bed and Lindsay comforts him, assuring him that both his mom and the baby will be fine.

The cast traveled to Nepal. In addition to the customary exotic vacation that is handed to RW cast members in each season, the trip was also used as a means of promoting REI, a local outdoor equipment store, and also for creating an audio diary to support their radio program. The cast climbs part of Mt. Everest, and Janet smokes on the trek. She eventually passes out from the elevation, and this frightens the cast.

The cast reacts negatively to the way the city of Seattle takes to The Real World being videotaped there. At one point, they notice a lot of people selling and wearing shirts that say, "Seattle says: The Real World sucks!"

In Episode 15, Irene moves out because, as she explains, she is experiencing a relapse of Lyme Disease. As Stephen and her are walking out to her car, she outs Stephen as homosexual. After exchanging insults and heated gestures with her and throwing her Teddy bear in the water; Stephen runs to her  car door, opens it and slaps her. The cast is subsequently shown the video, and is appalled. They are given the option to evict Stephen from the house, and after some deliberation, they agree to allow him to stay, provided he attends an anger management course.
In a previously unaired interview filmed at the time of her departure that aired during the 2000 reunion show, The Real World Reunion 2000, she explained that the main reason was her ethical objections to aspects of the show's production, which she characterized as an inauthentic environment designed to fabricate drama and conflict, and not the social experiment it was portrayed to be. McGee further explained that this was an unhealthy environment for her to  live in, and that the stress and manipulation of the production exacerbated her illness.

After filming
After the cast left the Real World pier, six of them, except for Irene, appeared to discuss their experiences both during and since their time on the show, Real World Seattle Blooper Show which aired after the season ended in 1998, and was hosted by Ananda Lewis.

While earning a master's degree in broadcast and communications from San Francisco State University, Irene McGee began a youth-oriented radio show/podcast, No One's Listening, The show has included interviews with Noam Chomsky, Lawrence Lessig, Brewster Kahle, Violet Blue, and Jimmy Wales, and won the 2006 Pubbie Award as Best Bay Area Podcast by the San Francisco Bay Area Publicity Club. She tours colleges to speak about media manipulation and reality television, has appeared on VH1 and E! Entertainment Television and was involved with a documentary about Lyme Disease, Under Our Skin: The Untold Story of Lyme Disease. She has a daughter, also named Irene.

Lindsey Brien went on to become both a TV reporter for local affiliate KHAS-TV in Hastings, NE and eventually to become part of the cast of morning team The Bert Show at radio station WWWQ in Atlanta. At last knowledge, Brien was co-host of a Tampa, Florida based TV show called The Spot.

Stephen Williams was arrested in 2001 for prostitution, and again in 2002 for stealing a car. At the 2008 Real World Awards Bash, he announced that he was gay, and engaged to his male partner Sheldon. He also stated that he apologized to Irene, and had rekindled his friendship with her, but Nathan refuted this. In the same night, Irene won the "Gone Baby Gone" award.

Rebecca Lord recorded a song with rapper Sir Mix-a-Lot. She is the leader of the pop band Becky, in which Keanu Reeves once played bass.

The Challenge

Bold indicates the contestant was a finalist on The Challenge.

References

External links
The Real World: Seattle at MTV.com
"The Real World: Seattle: Full Episodes, Photos, Episode Synopsis and Recaps". MTV.
"The Real World: Seattle: Meet the Cast". MTV.

Seattle
Television shows set in Seattle
1998 American television seasons
Television shows filmed in Washington (state)